Sericomyia bifasciata (Williston, 1887), the Long-nosed Pond Fly, is an uncommon species of syrphid fly. They have been observed from the northeastern part of North America. Hoverflies get their names from the ability to remain nearly motionless while in flight. The adults are also known as flower flies for they are commonly found around and on flowers, from which they get both energy-giving nectar and protein-rich pollen. The larvae in the genus Sericomyia are known as the rat-tailed with a long breathing tube taylored for aquatic environments. The larvae for this species are unknown.

Diagnostics
Flies rather short pile, not mimicking bumblebee.  Yellow face with medial black stripe. Face elongate below eye by more than three-fourth height of eye. Scutellum yellow pilinose. Yellow abdominal bands, two pair in male but 3 pairs in female, finger-like and widely spaced.

Description
For terms see Morphology of Diptera.
Size Length around 11 mm.
Head  There is a central black stripe on the yellow to orange face. The gena are shining black and the distance from the eye to the bottom of the face is more than 3/4th the height of the eye. The antennae are  brownish red with an elongated flagellum and a thinly plumose arista. The frons is black above the antennae and above that the black vertex has yellow pile. The eyes are bare, with the male [holoptic]and the  female dichoptic. The occiput pile and pollen both yellow.
Thorax  The dorsum of thorax is shining black and, thinly  pilose. On the inner side of each postpronotoum there is a spot of silvery pollen covered with yellow pile. The scutellum is black and covered with erect yellow  pile. Pleurae black with areas of pale yellow pile.

Wings  Wings are reddish brownish in front. The base of vein (R2+3) and the middle cross-veins, (r-m and bm-cu)  are narrowly clouded with brown. Vein (R4+5) is not  curved into the first posterior cell.

Legs The femora are black with yellow to orange apical tips. The tibia are yellow. Basitrarsi yellow, with the remaining tarsomeres black. Coxae are black.

Abdomen The abdomen has a shining black ground color with yellow pile the longest on the anterior sides. Segments 2 and 3 in the male and 2, 3 and 4 in the female have yellow finger shaped bands. The gap between the bands is about equal to the basal width of  segment 3 band.

External links
Boldsystems species page 
Images from Bugguide 
Images from Skevington

References

Further reading

 

Eristalinae
Articles created by Qbugbot
Insects described in 1887
Taxa named by Samuel Wendell Williston

Hoverflies of North America